Niall Thompson may refer to:
 Niall Thompson (soccer, born 1974), Canadian soccer player and coach
 Niall Thompson (footballer, born 1993), English footballer